Excideuil is a commune in the Dordogne department in Nouvelle-Aquitaine, southwestern France.

Geography

Excideuil is located in the Périgord Vert area, on a limestone plateau between the upper courses of the rivers Isle and Auvézère. The river Loue runs through the town. Its built-up area continues into the territory of the adjacent communes Saint-Martial-d'Albarède and Saint-Médard-d'Excideuil.

History

The first reference to Excideuil, as Exidolium is found in a will document from Aredius, also known as Yrieix, dated 572. The town has been referred also as Issidor, Excidour and Excideuilh. This name is made of the Celtic word ialo (meaning "clearing, glade", "place of") suffixed to a radical Exito (Gaul name) or Exitus.

Excideuil was attacked in 1182 around Pentecost by Richard I of England, as mentioned in Rerum gallicarum et francicarum scriptores:

Richardus, Henrici II filius, a patre Pictavensis Comes institutus, anno 1182 in exercitu Francorum Regis militabat adversus Philippum Flandriae Comitem. Eodem anno, mense julio, pace composita cum Lemovicensi vicecomite, duos ejus filios accepit obsides, et a Petragorico Comite castrum Petragoricum cum propugnaculis solo aequavit. Cum interim tractatum esset cum Engolismensibus et Petragoricensibus, circa Pentecosten Exidolium rediit, et ejusdem castri burgum cepit.

Gui d'Excideuil is an Old French romance, written in the 12th century, whose text is now lost.

Population

Notable persons
Thomas Robert Bugeaud (1784–1849), Marshal of France and Governor-General of Algeria
Philippe Parrot (1831–1894), painter

Sights
 Château d'Excideuil, 13th-18th century, national heritage site of France

See also
Communes of the Dordogne department

References

Recueil des historiens des Gaules et de la France: Rerum gallicarum et francicarum scriptores by Dom Michel Jean Joseph Brial

External links

 Official website 
 Official website of the school of Excudeuil

Communes of Dordogne
Arrondissement of Périgueux